Sheikh Abdussamad Esfahani,, also spelled Abdul Samad, 'Abd al-Samad, or Abd-ul-Samad, was a famous Ilkhanid era Shi'ite Sufi of the 13th century. 

The congregational (Jameh) mosque of Natanz was built around the tomb.

Further reading

External links
Archnet entry

Shrine Complex of Shaykh 'Abd al-Samad 
The Sheikh Abdolsamad Mosque in Natanz Iran 
Square Kufic script on the Sheikh Abd al-Samad shrine complex

Iranian Sufis
1299 deaths
Year of birth unknown